I Want to Live is the 12th studio album by American singer-songwriter John Denver released by RCA Records in November 1977.  The title song was dedicated to the "Hunger Project", for which Denver was on the board of directors.

The lead single was "How Can I Leave You Again", of which Record World said "It moves slowly but with feeling, and is bound to be a favorite with female audiences of all ages this autumn."

Track listing
All tracks composed by John Denver; except where indicated

Side one
 "How Can I Leave You Again" – 3:07
 "Tradewinds" – 3:17
 "Bet on the Blues" (Tom Paxton) – 3:50
 "It Amazes Me" – 2:35
 "To the Wild Country" – 4:31
 "Ripplin' Waters" (Jimmy Ibbotson) – 3:56

Side two
 "Thirsty Boots" (Eric Andersen) – 4:35
 "Dearest Esmeralda" (Bill Danoff) – 3:29
 "Singing Skies and Dancing Waters" – 4:01
 "I Want to Live" – 3:45
 "Druthers" – 2:43

Personnel
John Denver – guitar, vocals
James Burton – guitar
Renée Armand – vocals
Hal Blaine – drums
Mike Crumm – vocals
Chuck Domanico – bass
Michael Lang – keyboards
Herb Pedersen – banjo, guitar, vocals
Lee Ritenour – guitar
Lee Holdridge – orchestral arrangements
Technical
Don Wardell – Executive Producer
Kris O'Connor – production assistance
Mickey Crofford – engineer
Acy Lehman – art direction
Mark English – cover illustration

Charts

Weekly charts

Year-end charts

References

John Denver albums
1977 albums
Albums produced by Milt Okun
RCA Records albums